Besnik Bajram Mustafaj (born 1958) is an Albanian writer and diplomat.

Career
Mustafaj is a former Albanian ambassador to France. He became 62nd foreign minister of Albania on 11 September 2005 when the government of Prime Minister Sali Berisha took office. He resigned on 24 April 2007 and was replaced by Lulzim Basha on 25 April. His resignation came after strong disagreements with Berisha. Further disagreements with the prime minister led to Mustafaj's withdrawal from politics in May 2009.

He is the board chairman of Albanian Institute for International Studies, a think tank based in Albania.

References

1958 births
Living people
People from Tropojë
Albanian writers
Government ministers of Albania
Foreign ministers of Albania
Ambassadors of Albania to France
Leaders of organizations